Some Kind of Love Story is a one-act play by Arthur Miller.  It was first presented in 1982 by the Long Wharf Theatre in New Haven, Connecticut, where it was combined with Elegy for a Lady under the title 2 by A.M.; the combination of these two plays has also been presented as Two-Way Mirror.

Miller adapted the play as the 1990 film Everybody Wins, directed by Karel Reisz and starring Debra Winger and Nick Nolte.

References

1982 plays
American plays adapted into films
One-act plays
Plays by Arthur Miller